Jaron Vicario (born 16 August 1999) is a Dutch-Curaçaoan footballer who plays as an attacking midfielder for Dutch club FC Dordrecht.

Club career
Vicario began his career in the youth set-up at SC Botlek, before moving to VV Spijkenisse. In 2016, Vicario joined Feyenoord, signing his first professional contract with the club on 24 May 2018. On 24 June 2019, Eerste Divisie club FC Dordrecht announced the signing of Vicario. He left the club after his contract expired in June 2021.

International career
During the 2018 CONCACAF U-20 Championship, Vicario made four appearances for Curaçao under-20's, scoring twice.

References

2000 births
Footballers from South Holland
Dutch people of Curaçao descent
Living people
People from Capelle aan den IJssel
Association football midfielders
Dutch footballers
Curaçao footballers
Curaçao youth international footballers
Feyenoord players
FC Dordrecht players
VV Spijkenisse players
Enosis Neon Paralimni FC players
SV 19 Straelen players
Eerste Divisie players
Regionalliga players
Curaçao expatriate footballers
Expatriate footballers in Cyprus
Curaçao expatriate sportspeople in Cyprus
Expatriate footballers in Germany
Curaçao expatriate sportspeople in Germany